The 11th Indian Division was an infantry division of the British Indian Army during World War I.  It was formed in December 1914 with two infantry brigades already in Egypt and a third formed in January 1915.  After taking part in the Actions on the Suez Canal, the division was dispersed as its brigades were posted away.

The division was commanded throughout its existence by Major-General Alexander Wallace.

History
The pre-war 22nd (Lucknow) Brigade and the 32nd (Imperial Service) Brigade (formed in October 1914) were posted to Egypt to help defend the Suez Canal.  The 11th Indian Division was formed on 24 December 1914 with these two brigades, and little else in terms of divisional troops.  A third brigade (31st) was formed in January 1915 with other units already in Egypt.  The division beat off Turkish attempts to cross the Suez Canal on 3–4 February 1915 in the Actions on the Suez Canal.

Thereafter, the division was dissolved in May 1915 with its brigades posted to the Suez Canal Defences.  The brigades did not last much longer: the 22nd and 32nd Brigades bere broken up in January 1916 and the 31st Brigade joined 10th Indian Division at the same time, but was also broken up a month later.

Order of Battle, January 1915
The division commanded the following units in January 1915:

Imperial Service Cavalry Brigade
1st Hyderabad Lancers
Mysore Lancers
Patiala Lancers
22nd (Lucknow) Brigade (Brigadier-General W.A. Watson)
2/10th Gurkha Rifles
3rd Brahmans
62nd Punjabis
92nd Punjabis
31st Indian Brigade (Brigadier-General A.H. Bingley)
2nd Queen Victoria's Own Rajput Light Infantry
27th Punjabis
93rd Burma Infantry
128th Pioneers
32nd (Imperial Service) Brigade (Brigadier-General H.D. Watson)
33rd Punjabis
Alwar Infantry (I.S.)
4th Gwalior Infantry (I.S.)
1st Patiala Infantry (I.S.)
Divisional troops
23rd Sikh Pioneers
21st (Kohat) Mountain Battery (Frontier Force)
121st Indian Field Ambulance
124th Indian Field Ambulance

See also

 List of Indian divisions in World War I

Notes

References

Bibliography

External links

British Indian Army divisions
Indian World War I divisions
Military units and formations established in 1914
Military units and formations disestablished in 1915